The OFC U-20 Championship 1974 was held in Tahiti.

Teams
The following teams entered the tournament:

 
 
 
  (host)

Fiji withdrew due to lack of funds. Taiwan had to withdraw due to the French government refusing to give out visas.

Group stage

Final

External links
Results by RSSSF

Beach
OFC U-20 Championship
Under 20
1974
OFC
1974 in youth association football